Juan Araujo Pino (November 24, 1920, La Carolina, Jaen, Spain – November 4, 2002, Seville, Spain) was a Spanish footballer. He played as a striker and his first club was Xerez FC.

He began his career playing in the amateur team of Sevilla, moving in 1943 to Xerez FC on loan. Two years later he returned to Seville, with which champions proclaimed in the 1945-1946 season, being an own goal which gave the title to Sevilla on Barcelona.2 Two years later, Champion Cup was proclaimed Generalissimo . He was at the club until 1956, for eleven consecutive years in which he played 210 league games and scored 136 goles.1 After his time at the Seville club went to Cordoba CF, where he played until 1957. His last stage as a professional was spent, Xerez computer on which he retired in 1958.

Clubs
1943–1945: Xerez F. C., Spain
1945–1956: Sevilla F.C., Spain
1956–1957: Córdoba C.F., Spain
1957–1958: Xerez C.D., Spain

Honours
Sevilla
Spanish La Liga: 1945–46
Copa del Generalísimo: 1948

References

External links
 
 Elpais.com (Spanish)
 Sevilla.abc.es (Spanish)

1920 births
2002 deaths
Spanish footballers
Association football forwards